North Industrial Suburban Development Area (SDA) is located in the city of Saskatoon, Saskatchewan, Canada.  Lower provincial corporate tax rates, no more provincial capital tax, and industrial lease and purchase rates which have stabilized very competitively with neighboring provinces have produced a demand for industrial property which exceeds supply. North Saskatoon Business Association (NSBA) promotes business interests in the Northern Industrial sector of Saskatoon.

For zoning purposes there are four major types of zoning in the North Industrial SDA.  There are light industrial areas which have economic business activity which do not interfere with neighborhood community interests, and are therefore zoned IL1 districts.  Heavy Industrial areas are also in this area which show industrial economic concern which may create nuisance activities during their operating day.  These zones are IH areas.a  A business park meets business environment concerns.  As well there are environmental industrial park zoning which ensures safe processing of environmentally hazardous products.  These four main zoning areas receive further designated zoning from the City of Saskatoon.
 IL1-General Light Industrial District proposed development above.
 IL2-Limited Intensity Light Industrial District no conflict from the industry's processes to environment or neighbors.
 IL3-Limited Intensity Light Industrial District industry does not affect surroundings, but may need to create buffer zones to achieve this affect.
 IB-Industrial Business District plans to combine industry and business.
 IH-Heavy Industrial District
 AM-Auto Mall District serves customers to sell and service vehicles.
 Holding Symbol ‘H’ land parcel with uncertain development.
 RA1-Reinvestment Area District effectively re-vitalizes a deteriorating area.
 DM3-Saskatoon Planning District Zoning (Industrial 3 District) the transition stage wherein a rural area recently becomes an urban area, and zoning must complement both rural and urban planning.

The North Industrial SDA combines industrial and commercial land. There is still one large livestock operation within the SDA region. There is also a residential area remaining which is McNab Park the old RCAF housing. Larkhaven industrial is located in the area of the Saskatoon Inn.

Layout

North Industrial SDA is a part of the west side community of Saskatoon.  It lies (generally) south of the outskirts of the City and the Rural Municipality of Corman Park No. 344, west of Lawson SDA, north of the  Confederation SDA, and east of the Rural Municipality of Corman Park No. 344.

Subdivisions 
There are to date 12 industrial areas in Saskatoon.  There are five industrial areas located in the North Industrial Suburban Development Area (SDA) which are Agriplace, Airport Business Area, Hudson Bay Industrial, Marquis Industrial, and North Industrial.  The other seven industrial areas  of Saskatoon are C.N. Industrial, Nutana SDA, West Industrial, Confederation SDA, Southwest Industrial, Confederation SDA, Sutherland Industrial, University Heights SDA, AgPro Industrial, Confederation SDA, Central Industrial, Core Neighbourhoods SDA, Kelsey-Woodlawn and Lawson SDA.

Development
There are plans to revamp the North Industrial SDA which include changing Airport Drive format to a “Gateway to Saskatoon”.  To introduce Larkhaven Park formation as a park space.  There is a process to phase out residential communities for example at McNab Park and re-vamp the area to light industrial and business park uses. There are approximately 600 people living in the Airport Industrial Area in 163 dwellings.  This area was formerly known as R.C.A.F. McNab Park.  There are about 352 businesses in the Airport Industrial Area There are also future plans to develop the area west of Airport Drive and North west of Circle Drive.

Transportation 

The North Industrial SDA is served by air for imports and exports to the industrial area by the  Access to the Industrial SDA is achieved by Saskatoon Transit bus routes to the area which are the 11 Airport – Exhibition and the 14 North Industrial – City Centre.  Access is also provided to the North Industrial SDA by the city's Circle Drive trucking route which is concurrent to Yellowhead Highway, Trans-Canada Highway, and Highway 16.  The North Industrial SDA has easy access to Idylwyld Drive which runs concurrent with Highway 11 or Louis Riel Trail, connecting Regina, Saskatoon and Prince Albert, Saskatchewan.  It also connects Saskatoon with the bedroom communities of Warman and Martensville.  The CNR rail line runs in a north-south direction on the east perimeter of the North Industrial SDA and the area is serviced by spur lines.

Recreation facilities
Another feature of industrial areas are recreational facilities.  In the North Industrial SDA are the Canlan Ice Sports – Agriplace as well as the Credit Union Centre. The Credit Union Centre hosts concerts, Blades Hockey Games and Draggins Rod and Custom Show

References

External links 
 Agriplace subdivision map
 City of Saskatoon City of Saskatoon · Departments · Community Services · City Planning · ZAM Maps
 Populace Spring 2006

Neighbourhoods in Saskatoon
Industrial parks in Canada